Jesper Hansen (born 31 March 1985) is a Danish professional footballer who plays as a goalkeeper for AGF. He accumulated 18 youth caps for Denmark at six different age groups.

Early life
Hansen played for Ølstykke FC during his youth career, before moving onto Farum BK in 2000.

Senior career

F.C. Nordsjælland
Having shown potential to be a promising goalkeeper, Hansen was promoted to the Farum BK first team in January 2003 and signed his first contract extension in May 2003.

Having yet to make his debut for the first team, Hansen went on loan to Ølstykke FC in December 2004, the team he previously played for at youth level. He extended his stay at Ølstykke for an additional six months, where he was first choice goalkeeper for the team who were struggling to avoid regulation in the Danish 1st Division. He went on to make 37 league appearances during his year-long stay at Ølstykke.

He returned to F.C. Nordsjælland in November 2005 as backup for first team choice Kim Christensen, playing for FCN's reserve side in the Denmark Series.

In August 2007, having yet to make his league debut, with two first team appearances in cup competitions, Hansen renewed his contract for another four years. He claimed to have turned down first team opportunities from 1st Division clubs, to instead be patient and wait for his chance with FCN, whom he credited for his football education.

First choice goalkeeper and captain Kim Christensen was sold to IFK Göteborg on 13 March 2008. Theis F. Rasmussen was then brought in on a free, leaving speculation on who would be first choice to replace the departed Christensen. It was expected that Rasmussen was to be ahead of Hansen in selection, as was a common occurrence in the national youth team, though Hansen went go on to be first choice and Rasmussen failed to make a single league appearance during his two-season stay with F.C. Nordsjælland.

On 17 March 2008, head coach Morten Wieghorst gave Hansen his league debut, after almost five years as backup. He started the game in goal against F.C. Midtjylland, which they lost 1–0. His first clean sheet came a week later in a 1–0 win over Brøndby. Hansen went on to concede 26 goals in his first 15 appearances in the last half of the 2007–08 season, since his debut, giving FCN one of the worst defence records in the league, the team finished 9th in the league.

With F.C. Nordsjælland ending the first half of the 2008–09 season close to relegation, the club opted to bring in experienced Serbian goalkeeper Nenad Novaković on a free transfer, taking over as first choice, Hansen being demoted back to the bench for the rest of the season. The gamble paid off, as the club avoided relegation once again, finishing a slightly improved 8th in the league. At the start of the 2009–10 season, Hansen broke his thumb, ending any chance of him retaking the first choice position as goalkeeper for the duration of the injury. The situation resulted in the club bringing in Thomas Villadsen as backup for Novaković, on a temporary deal.

Mid season, after some poor performances from Novaković, Hansen was given a chance to retake the goalkeeping position, with a start against AGF, he managed to keep a clean sheet in a 2–0 win and consequently returned as first choice for FCN. He claimed after the match that being benched was a learning experience.

Hansen went on to make some instrumental performances for the rest of the season, including a strong performance against league champions F.C. Copenhagen, keeping a clean sheet in a shock 2–0 win, as well as being credited for keeping the Farum club alive in their 3–1 Danish cup quarter final win against Silkeborg. Hansen went on to be part of the Danish cup winning squad, his first senior trophy, in a 2–0 win over F.C. Midtjylland in the final.

Hansen retained his position as first choice the following 2010–11 season, with head coach Morten Wieghorst often praising his performances in the media. Hansen as well as the team slowly improved throughout the season, gaining on their previous league finish with 6th and once again went to the finals of the Danish cup, lifting the trophy for a second consecutive time, in a 3–2 win over FCM. With Hansen's contract expiring at the end of the season, there was speculation whether or not he would remain at the club. Jesper Hansen had hinted at trying something new, but nothing materialised. He eventually signed a new contract, keeping him at the club for another year, till summer 2012.

Starting the 2011–12 season for FCN in impressive form, with good performances against Sporting Lisbon and HB Køge and helping the team peak to 2nd in the Danish Superliga, Hansen is linked with a possible move abroad, with foreign clubs taking note of his recent form. Hansen's agent stating that he may leave the club on a transfer during the winter of 2011, or on a free when his contract expires in the summer of 2012. On 24 September 2011, in a match with AGF, Hansen was involved in a collision with striker Søren Larsen, which resulted in Hansen going off in the 44th minute and was rushed to hospital. He was diagnosed with a concussion and spent the next few days in hospital to be monitored. Hansen returned to action on 15 October, keeping a clean sheet in a 1–0 win over AaB. At the start of the winter break, Jesper Hansen signed a new two-year contract extension with F.C. Nordsjælland.

Evian
In August 2013, Hansen signed with Evian on a three-year contract. Brought in as a backup to Bertrand Laquait, he nonetheless developed into a starter during the 2013–14 season.

Halfway through the 2014–15 season, Hansen was benched for Benjamin Leroy who had joined the club from Tours ahead of the campaign. Evian suffered relegation at the end of the season, and Hansen continued as the backup to Leroy in the 2015–16 Ligue 2 season.

Bastia
On 8 August 2015, SC Bastia announced the signing of Hansen.

Lyngby Boldklub
On 22 June 2016, Hansen returns to his native Denmark and signed a three-year contract for Denmark club Lyngby Boldklub.

International career
January 2006, during a mini-tournament in Chile, Hansen saved a penalty in a penalty shootout for the Danish under-21s to book a place in the finals against Unión Española. They would go on to win 1–0 with a goal from Morten Rasmussen. Hansen was selected for the Denmark U21 squad for UEFA U-21 Championship 2006 in Portugal. He was 3rd choice behind Kevin Stuhr Ellegaard and Theis F. Rasmussen.

On 3 November 2011, Hansen received his first call up to the senior national team to face Sweden in a friendly. Hansen was once again called up in December 2011, for Denmark's tour of Thailand in January.

In May 2018 he was named in Denmark’s preliminary 35-man squad for the 2018 World Cup in Russia. However, he did not make the final 23.

Personal life
Hansen has stated that he has been a fan of Juventus since Zinedine Zidane moved to the Turin based club, and that his idol is Gianluigi Buffon. His dream move would be to go to Juventus as Buffon's successor.

Honours
FC Nordsjælland
 Danish Superliga: 2011–12
 Danish Cup: 2009–10, 2010–11

FC Midtjylland
 Danish Superliga: 2017–18, 2019–20
 Danish Cup: 2018–19

Footnotes and references

External links
 
 
 

1985 births
Living people
People from Frederikssund Municipality
Association football goalkeepers
Danish men's footballers
Denmark youth international footballers
Denmark under-21 international footballers
FC Nordsjælland players
Ølstykke FC players
Thonon Evian Grand Genève F.C. players
SC Bastia players
Lyngby Boldklub players
FC Midtjylland players
Aarhus Gymnastikforening players
Danish Superliga players
Ligue 1 players
Danish expatriate men's footballers
Danish expatriate sportspeople in France
Expatriate footballers in France
Sportspeople from the Capital Region of Denmark